Kailasanathar Temple is a Shiva located at Melakaveri near Kumbakonam, in Thanjavur district, Tamil Nadu, India.

Location
This temple is found on East Street at Melakaveri.

Structure
 Next to the entrance nandhi and balipeeda is found. Just before the sanctum sanctorum Vinayaka and Subramania are found. The presiding deity is known as Kailasanathar. Kosta, Dakshinamurti, Lingodbhava and Durga are found. In the left of the shrine of the presiding deity the shrine of goddess Karpagambal is found. In the prakara Gnanasambandar, Chokkiyar, Chandra, Bhairava, Sanisvara, Surya and shrines of Vinayaka, Subramania with Valli and Deivanai, Sundaresvarar, Meenakshi, Chandikeswarar and Navagrahas are found.

Kumbakonam Sapta Stana Temple
This is one of the Saptha Stana Temples of Kumbakonam. During the Mahahaman of 2016 the palanquin festival was held on 7 February 2016. Following the tirttavari held at Mahamaham tank on 21 April 2016, the palanquin festival of the Sapta Stana Temples were held on 23 April 2016. The festival which started from Kumbesvara Temple at the 7.30 p.m. of 23 April 2016 completed on the morning of 25 April 2016 after going to the following temples.

 Adi Kumbeswarar Temple, Kumbakonam  
 Amirthakadeswarar Temple, Sakkottai  
 Avudainathar Temple, Darasuram 
 Kabartheeswarar Temple 
 Kottaiyur Kodeeswarar Temple 
 Kailasanathar Temple, Melakaveri
 Swaminatha Swamy Temple

Kumbhabhishekham
The Kumbhabhishekham of this temple was held on 21 March 2005 and 2 November 2015.

References

Shiva temples in Thanjavur district